Environmental and conservation organizations in the United States have been formed to help protect the environment, habitats, flora, and fauna on federally owned land, on private land, within coastal limits, in-state conservation areas, in-state parks and in locally governed municipalities. In addition, some organizations utilize the court system in states and at the federal level to enforce environmental and conservation regulations and laws. Most organizations operate as nonprofits. The revenue of these organizations is used to achieve their goals rather than distributing them as profit or dividends.

After a nonprofit environmental and conservation organization has been established at the state level, it typically applies for tax exempt status with U.S. federal income tax. Failure to maintain operations in conformity to the laws may result in an organization losing its tax exempt status. Individual states and localities offer nonprofits exemptions from other taxes such as sales tax or property tax. An environmental and conservation organization that is tax exempt is required to file annual financial reports (IRS Form 990). These tax forms are required to be made available to the public.

Government agencies 

 United States Department of the Interior
 Environmental Protection Agency
 Fish and Wildlife Service
 National Park Service

Native American Nations
 Akwesasne Task Force on the Environment
 Eyak Preservation Council
 Indigenous Environmental Network
 Inter-Tribal Environmental Council
 InterTribal Sinkyone Wilderness Council

Alphabetical listing 

 350 Bay Area
 5 Gyres
 Abalone Alliance (historic)
 Adirondack Mountain Club
 African American Environmentalist Association
 African Wild Dog Conservancy
 Alaska Conservation Foundation
 Allegheny Land Trust
 Alliance for Climate Protection — see Climate Reality Project, The
 Alliance to Save Energy
 American Bird Conservancy
 American Farmland Trust
 American Forests
 American Prairie Foundation
 Appalachian Voices
 Arlington Coalition on Transportation (ACT)
 Audubon movement
 Aytzim: Ecological Judaism
 BARK
 Ballona Wetlands
 Big Green Bus, The
 Bonneville Environmental Foundation
 Boone and Crockett Club
 Builders for the Bay
 California Trout (CalTrout)
 Californians Against Waste
 Californians for Population Stabilization
 Carbon180
 Center for Biological Diversity
 Center for Environmental Philosophy
 Center for Food Safety
 Center for International Environmental Law
 Ceres
 Chesapeake Bay Foundation
 Citizens Campaign for the Environment
 Citizens Climate Lobby
 Clean Water Action
 The Climate Reality Project
 The Climate Mobilization
 ConservAmerica
 The Conservation Fund
 Conservation International
 Conservation Law Foundation
 Conserving Carolina
 Cool Effect
 Defenders of Wildlife
 Ducks Unlimited
 Earth Day
 Earth First!
 Earth Island Institute
 Earthjustice
 Earth Liberation Army (ELA)
 Earth Liberation Front (ELF)
 Earth Policy Institute
 Earth's Birthday Project
 Ecotrust
 Engineers for a Sustainable World
 Environment America
 Environment California
 Environmental and Energy Study Institute (EESI)
 Environmental Defense Fund
 Environmental Design Research Association (EDRA)
 Environmental Integrity Project (EIP)
 Environmental Law Institute
 Environmental Life Force (ELF)
 Environmental Working Group
 Franciscan Action Network
 GivePower
 Global Water Policy Project
 Great March for Climate Action
 Greenguard Environmental Institute
 Greening of Detroit
 Greenpeace USA
 Heal the Bay
 Honor the Earth
 Hudson River Sloop Clearwater
 Institute for Energy and Environmental Research (IEER)
 Institute of Environmental Sciences and Technology (IEST)
 International Council on Nanotechnology (ICON)
 Island Conservation
 Izaak Walton League
 Keep America Beautiful
 League of Conservation Voters
 Marine Mammal Center, The
 McHenry County Conservation District (MCCD)
 Mission: Wolf
 National Audubon Society
 National CleanUp Day
 National Council for Science and the Environment (NCSE)
 National Geographic Society
 National Parks Conservation Association (NPCA)
 National Wildlife Federation
 National Wildlife Refuge Association
 Natural Resources Council of Maine
 Natural Resources Defense Council
 Nature Conservancy, The
 NatureServe
 Negative Population Growth
 New Dream
 New York–New Jersey Trail Conference
 Ocean Alliance
 Ocean Conservancy
 Ohio Citizen Action
 One Planet One Future
 One World One Ocean (California)
 Oregon Wild
 Pacific Environment
 People's Climate Movement
 Population Action International
 Population Connection
 Population Council
 Population Media Center
 Population Reference Bureau
 Power Shift Network
 Public Employees for Environmental Responsibility (PEER)
 Prairie Rivers Network
 Rainforest Action Network
 Resources for the Future (RFF)
 Rising Tide North America
 Riverkeeper
 Rocky Mountain Elk Foundation
 Royal River Conservation Trust
 RuckusRoots
 Sand County Foundation
 Santa Lucia Conservancy
 Save the Redwoods League
 Scenic Hudson
 School for Field Studies, The
 Sea Shepherd Conservation Society
 Sierra Club
 Sierra Student Coalition
 Silicon Valley Toxics Coalition
 Southeast Alaska Conservation Council (SEACC)
 Southern Environmental Law Center
 Southern Utah Wilderness Alliance
 Stand.earth
 Student Conservation Association
 Student Environmental Action Coalition (SEAC)
 Surfrider Foundation
 Texas Campaign for the Environment
 Torreya Guardians
 TreePeople
 Trout Unlimited
 The Trust for Public Land
 Union of Concerned Scientists
 Waterkeeper Alliance
 West Harlem Environmental Action (WEACT)
 WILD Foundation
 Wild Salmon Center
 Wilderness Society, The
 WildEarth Guardians
 Wild Farm Alliance
 Wildlife Conservation Network
 The Wildlife Society
 Wild Montana
 Whippany River Watershed Action Committee
 Worldwatch Institute
 World Wildlife Fund (WWF)
 Wyoming Outdoor Council

See also 
 Environmental community organizations
 List of conservation organisations
 List of environmental agencies in the United States
 List of environmental organizations
 List of environmental organizations in the Sacramento region of California
 List of green political parties
 List of population concern organizations
 List of renewable energy organizations
 Nonprofit organization

References

 01
 01
USA
Environment
Organizations